A video essay is a piece of video content that, much like a written essay, advances an argument. Video essays take advantage of the structure and language of film to advance their arguments.

Popularity
While the medium has its roots in academia, it has grown dramatically in popularity with the advent of the online video sharing platforms like YouTube and Vimeo. While most of such videos are intended for entertainment, some argue that they can have an academic purpose as well. In 2021, the Netflix series Voir premiered featuring video essays focusing on films like 48 Hrs and Lady Vengeance.

Notable video essayists
Frequently cited examples of video essayists and series include Every Frame a Painting (a series on the grammar of film editing by Tony Zhou and Taylor Ramos) and Lindsay Ellis (an American media critic, film critic, YouTuber, and author formerly known as The Nostalgia Chick) who was inspired by Zhou and Ramos's work. Websites like StudioBinder, MUBI, and Fandor also have contributing writers providing their own video essays. One such contributor, Kevin B. Lee, helped assert video essays' status as a legitimate form of film criticism as Chief Video Essayist for Fandor from 2011-2016. Other video essayists include Korean-American filmmaker Kogonada, British film scholar Catherine Grant, Canadian cultural commentator J.J. McCullough, and French media researcher Chloé Galibert-Laîné.

In 2017, Sight & Sound, the magazine published by the British Film Institute (BFI), started an annual polls of the best video essays of the year.  The 2021 poll reported that 38% of the essayists whose work received a nomination are female (which implies an increase of the 5% from the previous year), and that predominantly the video essays are in English (95%).

In 2020, curator Cydnii Wilde Harris, along with Will DiGravio and Kevin B. Lee, collaboratively curated The Black Lives Matter Video Essay Playlist, highlighting the medium's activist potential. Because the video essay format is digestible yet often emotionally impactful and can be created without requiring expensive equipment, it has served as a crucial tool for filmmakers and community organizers who have been marginalized from mainstream film criticism and media production.

Criticism
Some have argued that essays from YouTube personalities, while well-produced, can be gussied-up opinion pieces and the analysis of said videos can be taken as fact by the viewer due to their convincing academic deliveries.

Studies
In 2014, MediaCommons and Cinema Journal, the official publication of the Society for Cinema Studies, joined to create [in]Transition, the first journal devoted exclusively to peer reviewed publication of videographic scholarly work. The journal is designed not only as a means to present selected videographic work, but to create a context for understanding it – and validating it – as a new mode of scholarly writing for the discipline of cinema and media studies and related fields.

Since 2015 under a grant from the National Endowment for the Humanities, and under the auspices of Middlebury’s Digital Liberal Arts Summer Institute, Professors Jason Mittell, Christian Keathley and Catherine Grant have organized a two-week workshop with the aim to explore a range of approaches by using moving images as a critical language and to expand the expressive possibilities available to innovative humanist scholars. Every year the workshop is attended by 15 scholars working in film and media studies or a related field, whose objects of study involve audio-visual media, especially film, television, and other new digital media forms. 

In 2018, Tecmerin: Revista de Ensayos Audiovisuales began as another peer-reviewed academic publication exclusively dedicated to videographic criticism. The same year Will DiGravio launched the Video Essay Podcast, featuring interviews with prominent video essayists. 

In 2021 the research project Video Essay. Futures of Audiovisual Research and Teaching funded by the Swiss National Science Foundation started, led by media scholar and video essayist Johannes Binotto, with Chloé Galibert-Laîné, Oswald Iten, and Jialu Zhu as main researchers.

See also
 
 Collage film
 Supercut
 Cinephilia
 Film criticism

References

External links
Peer Reviewed Journal In-Transition
Scholarship in Sound and Image
The Video Essay Research Project

Essays
Film and video technology
Media studies
Visual arts
Film theory
2010s in film
2020s in film
Film and video fandom